Victoria Street station may refer to:
Victoria Street railway station, New South Wales, a railway station in Maitland, New South Wales, Australia
Victoria Street railway station, Perth, Western Australia
Victoria Street station (Metro Transit), a light rail station in Saint Paul, Minnesota, US

See also
Belfast Great Victoria Street railway station
Queen Victoria Street tube station, a proposed station on the Central London Railway. 
Victoria station (disambiguation)
Victoria Street (disambiguation)
Victoria Street tram stop in Blackpool, England